Sakhiya ( Companion) is a 2004 Telugu language drama film written and directed by Jayanth C. Paranjee. This film starred Tarun, Nauheed Cyrusi, Lakshmi in pivotal roles. The soundtrack of the film was composed by Mani Sharma, and received positive reviews.

Plot
Hari (Tarun) is a happy-go-lucky youngster. His family is in big financial trouble as they need around Rs. 10 lakhs. Hari happens to save a factionist Durga Devi (Lakshmi) from her rival gang. Durga Devi gives him some money as a token of gratitude. She offers to give the entire amount he needs if he successfully brings back her daughter Chandana (Nauheed) from Switzerland.

Chandana prefers to stay in Switzerland, rather than her faction-ridden homeland. Hari travels to Switzerland, falls in love with Chandana and also makes sure that Chandana also falls in love with him. They travel back to India. Once he hands over Chandana to Durga Devi, Hari realizes that Durga Devi cheated him. Durga Devi wants to take revenge on her faction rival and also Chandana's father (Raj Kumar) by getting her son married to Chandana. The rest of the story is about how Hari saves Chandana from the clutches of Durga Devi and teaches Durga a lesson.

Cast

Soundtrack

Release 
The film was released in 2004 and opened to positive reviews and good collections.

References

External links

2004 films
2000s Telugu-language films
Films scored by Mani Sharma
Indian action films
Films directed by Jayanth C. Paranjee
2004 action films